Denny Diante is an American music producer, arranger, and engineer. On March 28, 2012, Diante was announced as the president of eMax Media Group.  Diante is listed in Billboard Magazine's Encyclopedia of 100 Most Successful Record Producers.

Diante has produced numerous notable artists including B. B. King, Barbra Streisand, Bill Withers, Bobby Brown, Boston, Deneice Williams, Elton John, Glenn Frey, Grateful Dead, Jerry Lee Lewis, John Denver, Johnny Mathis, Julio Iglesias, Maxine Nightingale, Merle Haggard, Neil Diamond, Paul Anka, Sheena Easton, The Oak Ridge Boys, and Tina Turner.

References

External links
https://www.imdb.com/name/nm1205631/?ref_=nv_sr_srsg_0
http://www.dennydiante.com/denny_diante_biography.html

Living people
Year of birth missing (living people)
American record producers